Vivekananda Kendra Vidyalaya, Shergaon, popularly known as VKV Shergaon is a co-educational higher secondary school in Shergaon village, 60 km from Bomdila in West Kameng district, Arunachal Pradesh, India. The school opened in 1981.

The school consists of more than 500 Students. The principal of school is Shri Ashim Kumar Banik. It has 5 trust-run hostels and 4 private hostels.

VKV organisation was found by Shri Eknath Ranade. It has its headquarters situated in the southernmost-point of India Kanyakumari, Tamil Nadu.

It has different science labs for each subject physics, chemistry and biology and has three playgrounds and has a Shiv Mandir situated nearby.

All festivals are celebrated with huge enjoyment. Additional subjects taught are Sanskrit, computer, and physical exercise.

It comes under the CBSE curriculum and connects students with their spiritual spirit.

VKV Shergaon is one of the schools run by Vivekananda Kendra, a spiritual oriented service mission.

References

Private schools in Arunachal Pradesh
West Kameng district
Vivekananda Kendra schools
Educational institutions established in 1981
1981 establishments in Arunachal Pradesh